Mark Allen Satterthwaite is an economist at the Kellogg School of Management at Northwestern University in Evanston, Illinois. He is currently A.C. Buehler Professor in Hospital & Health Services Management, Professor of Strategic Management & Managerial Economics, and chair of the Management & Strategy Department. He is a fellow of the Econometric Society and a member of the American Academy of Arts and Sciences.

See also
 Gibbard–Satterthwaite theorem
 Muller–Satterthwaite theorem
 Myerson–Satterthwaite theorem

References

External links
 Satterthwaite's faculty web page

American economists
Fellows of the Econometric Society
Fellows of the American Academy of Arts and Sciences
Living people
Year of birth missing (living people)
Kellogg School of Management faculty
University of Wisconsin–Madison alumni
California Institute of Technology alumni